Madonna and Child with St John the Baptist and St Catherine of Alexandria may refer to:
 Madonna and Child with St John the Baptist and St Catherine of Alexandria (Perugino)
 Madonna and Child with St John the Baptist and St Catherine of Alexandria (Previtali)